The 4th Asia Pacific Screen Awards were held in 2010.

Awards

Films and countries with multiple nominations

References

Asia Pacific Screen Awards
Asia Pacific Screen Awards